The Trousers (German: Die Hose) is a 1927 German silent comedy film directed by Hans Behrendt and starring Werner Krauss, Jenny Jugo and Rudolf Forster. It was based on a play by Carl Sternheim. Art direction was by Heinrich Richter and Franz Schroedter. The film is notable for the performance of Veit Harlan, later the director who made the controversial antisemitic Jew Suss, as a Jewish barber in a film made by a director who later died in the holocaust.

Cast
 Werner Krauss as Theobald Maske 
 Jenny Jugo as Luise Maske 
 Rudolf Forster as Scarron 
 Veit Harlan as Mandelstam 
 Christian Bummerstaedt as Fürst 
 Olga Limburg as Elfri de Deuter

References

Bibliography
 Kreimeier, Klaus. The Ufa Story: A History of Germany's Greatest Film Company, 1918-1945. University of California Press, 1999.
 Prawer, S.S. Between Two Worlds: The Jewish Presence in German and Austrian Film, 1910-1933. Berghahn Books, 2005.

External links

1927 films
Films of the Weimar Republic
German silent feature films
German comedy films
Films directed by Hans Behrendt
German films based on plays
1927 comedy films
Films with screenplays by Franz Schulz
German black-and-white films
Phoebus Film films
Silent comedy films
1920s German films